Barbara Barrow (born April 15, 1955) is an American professional golfer who played on the LPGA Tour.

Barrow played college golf at San Diego State University, when in 1975 she won the national individual intercollegiate golf championship. She was a member of the U.S. Curtis Cup team in 1976. She was inducted into the San Diego State University Aztec Hall of Fame in 1992

Barrow turned professional after graduating and began playing on the LPGA Tour and also coached the women's golf team at Long Beach State from 1977 to 1980.

Barrow won once on the LPGA Tour in 1980.

Professional wins (1)

LPGA Tour wins (1)

Team appearances
Amateur
Curtis Cup (representing the United States): 1976 (winners)

References

External links

American female golfers
San Diego State Aztecs women's golfers
LPGA Tour golfers
1955 births
Living people